Casco is a village in Kewaunee County, Wisconsin, United States. The population was 583 at the 2010 census. It is part of the Green Bay Metropolitan Statistical Area. The village is located within the Town of Casco. Casco is named after Casco Bay on the coast of Maine, the previous home of Edward Decker, an early logger in Kewaunee County.

Geography
Casco is located at  (44.554174, -87.620741).

Demographics

2010 census
As of the census of 2010, there were 583 people, 230 households, and 155 families living in the village. The racial makeup of the village was 91.1% White, 1.0% African American, 2.4% Native American, 3.8% from other races, and 1.7% from two or more races. Hispanic or Latino of any race were 7.5% of the population.

There were 230 households, of which 37.0% had children under the age of 18 living with them, 53.5% were married couples living together, 11.3% had a female householder with no husband present, 2.6% had a male householder with no wife present, and 32.6% were non-families. 28.3% of all households were made up of individuals, and 17.4% had someone living alone who was 65 years of age or older. The average household size was 2.53 and the average family size was 3.15.

The median age in the village was 35.6 years. 29.7% of residents were under the age of 18; 4.8% were between the ages of 18 and 24; 27.7% were from 25 to 44; 21.6% were from 45 to 64; and 16.3% were 65 years of age or older. The gender makeup of the village was 47.5% male and 52.5% female.

2000 census
As of the census of 2000, there were 572 people, 227 households, and 162 families living in the village. The racial makeup of the village was 97.55% White, 0.70% Native American, 0.87% from other races, and 0.87% from two or more races. 0.87% of the population were Hispanic or Latino of any race.

There were 227 households, out of which 34.8% had children under the age of 18 living with them, 60.4% were married couples living together, 7.0% had a female householder with no husband present, and 28.2% were non-families. 25.1% of all households were made up of individuals, and 12.8% had someone living alone who was 65 years of age or older. The average household size was 2.52 and the average family size was 3.01.

In the village, the population was spread out, with 27.1% under the age of 18, 7.2% from 18 to 24, 30.6% from 25 to 44, 18.7% from 45 to 64, and 16.4% who were 65 years of age or older. The median age was 36 years. For every 100 females, there were 93.9 males. For every 100 females age 18 and over, there were 91.3 males.

The median income for a household in the village was $44,583, and the median income for a family was $50,000. Males had a median income of $36,029 versus $24,444 for females. The per capita income for the village was $18,168. About 2.8% of families and 4.0% of the population were below the poverty line, including 1.9% of those under age 18 and 9.6% of those age 65 or over.

Gallery

References

External links 

 Village of Casco

Villages in Kewaunee County, Wisconsin
Villages in Wisconsin
Green Bay metropolitan area